Deh Rash may refer to:
Deh Rash-e Bazan
Deh Rash-e Nahrab